Alfred Starr Hamilton (June 14, 1914 – 2005) was an American poet.  A lifelong resident of Montclair, New Jersey, Hamilton contributed to many small presses, including Epoch, New Directions, Foxfire, New Letters, Archive, Poetry Now, American Poetry Review and Greenfield Review.  His work has been championed by Jonathan Williams and Ron Silliman and his poetry was included in the first issue of Thomas Merton's Monk's Pond.

The first full-length collection of his poetry (and the only one to appear in Hamilton’s lifetime) was The Poems of Alfred Starr Hamilton, published in 1970 by The Jargon Society as Jargon 49.

Bibliography 

Sphinx (1968)
The Poems of Alfred Starr Hamilton (1970) (ASIN: B000FAC1IY)
The Big Parade (1982)
A Dark Dreambox of Another Kind: The Poems of Alfred Starr Hamilton (2013)

References

External links 
 Alfred Starr Hamilton 
 Guide to the Alfred Starr Hamilton Papers 1963-2015 at the University of Chicago Special Collections Research Center 

1914 births
2005 deaths
20th-century American poets